Foreign relations of the Philippines are administered by the President of the Philippines and the Department of Foreign Affairs. Philippine international affairs are influenced by ties to its Southeast Asian neighbors, China, the United States, and the Middle East.

The Philippines is a founding member of the United Nations; an elected member of the Security Council
and participant in the FAO, International Labour Organization (ILO), UNESCO and World Health Organization. Like most nations, the Philippines is a signatory of Interpol. The Philippines is a member of the Association of Southeast Asian Nations, East Asia Summit and Association of Caribbean States (as observer). It was formerly a member of the now-defunct Latin Union and the SEATO. Declaring itself as independent of any major power block of nations, the Philippines is a member of the Non-Aligned Movement.

Economically, the Philippines is a participant in the Asia-Pacific Economic Cooperation, Asian Development Bank, the Colombo Plan, Group of 24, G-20, G-77, the World Bank, Next Eleven and the World Trade Organization (WTO).

Foreign policy

Philippine foreign policy is based on the advancement of Filipino ideals and values, which include the advancement of democracy and advocacy for human rights worldwide.

The Philippines actively engages with regional neighbors in Southeast Asia through the Association of Southeast Asian Nations (as a founding member) with the intention of strengthening regional harmony, stability, and prosperity. It has been a supporter of East Timor since the latter's independence and has expanded trade links with its traditional allies Indonesia, Malaysia, Singapore, and Thailand. Relations with Vietnam and Cambodia have thawed in the 1990s after their entry into the ASEAN.

The Republic of the Philippines considers itself a staunch ally of the United States and has supported many points of American foreign policy. This is evident in the Philippines' participation in the Iraq War and the War on Terror. Speaking to this support, U.S. President George W. Bush praised the Philippines as a bastion of democracy in the East and called the Philippines America's oldest ally in Asia. President Bush's speech on October 18, 2003, was only the second U.S. presidential address to the Philippine Congress; U.S. President Dwight D. Eisenhower delivered the first.

With a robust relationship to the United States, the administration of former President Gloria Macapagal Arroyo sought to establish closer ties to its earlier colonizer, Spain. This was inspired by the attendance of King Juan Carlos and Queen Sofía at the June 12, 1998 celebration honoring the centennial of the Philippines' independence from Spain. President Macapagal-Arroyo made two official visits to Spain during her presidency.

In recent years, the Philippines attaches great importance in its relations with China, and has established significant cooperation with the country.

The Armed Forces of the Philippines has participated in various regional conflicts, including the Korean War and the Vietnam War. Recently, the Philippines sent peacekeeping forces to Iraq, in addition to civilian doctors, nurses and police. The Filipino mission was later recalled as collateral for the release of a Filipino hostage. As part of a UN Peacekeeping Operation, Philippine Army General Jaime de los Santos became the first commander of troops responsible for maintaining order in East Timor.

The Philippines is in tension with rival international claimants to various land and water territories in the South China Sea. The Philippines is currently in dispute with the People's Republic of China over the Camago and Malampaya gas fields. The two countries are also in dispute over the Scarborough Shoal. Additionally, the Philippines has a disputed claim over the Spratly Islands.

Relations with other Asian nations have been strong. Japan, which has been an active donor of aid, has close ties with the country. Relations with China have recently been expanded, especially with regards to the economy. The presence of a large South Korean expatriate community has led to the expansion of relations between the two nations. India and Saudi Arabia have also been an important partners.

In recent years, the Philippines has been distancing itself from the West due to its active role in the Non-Aligned Movement and the G-77. This trend is reflected in its recent positions on Kosovo, Iran and Israel. Its relations with Japan, Indonesia, Australia, and Vietnam have strengthened into a new depth due to closer regional diplomatic, economic, cultural, and defense cooperation and the flaring tensions in the South China Sea dispute. Despite this, its relations with its defense treaty ally, the United States, remains strong.

On the other hand, relations with China continue to deteriorate due to disputes concerning the South China Sea, which is in the eastern portion of the South China Sea. Relations with Malaysia have been in a cordial and diplomatic stance due to safety measures since Malaysia was found to have been funding Islamic terrorist groups in the southern Philippines in the past due to the North Borneo dispute. The country is campaigning for Timor-Leste's membership in ASEAN. The Philippines is an active member in ASEAN with close ties with most of the members of the organization. It is expected to be one of the biggest economy in ASEAN by 2050.

Relations with specific countries and regions
Note: Date of formal relations may have discrepancy of one day due to differences in time zone and the location where the agreement establishing formal relations was signed.

Asia

Africa

Americas

Europe

Oceania

Relations with former states

Multilateral relations

Issues

See also
 Territories claimed by the Philippines
 List of diplomatic missions in the Philippines
 List of diplomatic missions of the Philippines
 List of diplomatic visits to the Philippines
 List of ambassadors to the Philippines

References

External links
Department of Foreign Affairs, Republic of the Philippines 
Permanent Mission of the Republic of the Philippines to the United Nations
The Philippines: Middle East Diplomacy and Marcos' Saudi Visit (CIA Intelligence Memorandum)